Hjalmar Olai Storeide (10 August 1901 – 21 November 1961) was a Norwegian politician for the Labour Party.

He was born in Hjørundfjord.

He was elected to the Norwegian Parliament from Hordaland in 1954, and was re-elected on two occasions. Shortly into his third term, he died and was replaced by Steffen Ingebriktsen Toppe.

Storeide was a member of Solund municipality council in 1945–1947, and deputy mayor of Moster municipality in 1951–1955.

References

1901 births
1961 deaths
Labour Party (Norway) politicians
Members of the Storting
20th-century Norwegian politicians